Montaut is a commune in the Pyrénées-Atlantiques department in south-western France.

Geography

Location
Montaut is situated at the east of the department, 25 km south-east of Pau. The commune is bordering the department of Hautes-Pyrénées.

Access
The commune is served by departmental roads 212, 812 and 937 and Line 0535 of the regional buses in the Pyrénées-Atlantiques. Montaut-Bétharram station has rail connections to Tarbes, Pau, Bordeaux and Bayonne.

Hydrography
The lands of the commune are watered by the Gave of Pau, tributary of the Adour, and by its tributaries, the stream of Siot (fed on Montaut by the streams of the Uchas and Bignes) and the Mouscle, itself joined on the commune by the stream, the Mousclère.

Places and Hamlets
Annette
 Loustau
 Pasquine
 Village
 Hameau d'en Bas
 Hameau d'en Haut
 Content
 Sarusse

Toponymy
The toponym Montaut appears in the forms Mont-Altus and the bastide of Montaut (12835 and the 14th century respectively, titles of Béarn) and Montaud (15355, reformation of Béarn).

Its Bearnese name is Montaut or Mountaut.

History
Montaut is a former bastide founded in 1327 by Marguerite de Moncade, the grandmother of Gaston III de Foix-Béarn. The original Bastidian plan still includes the remains of its past.

See also
Communes of the Pyrénées-Atlantiques department

References

Communes of Pyrénées-Atlantiques